The Boxer Movement, or Boxer Rebellion, was a Chinese uprising from November 1899 to September 7, 1901, against foreign influence in areas such as trade, politics, religion and technology that occurred in China during the final years of the Manchu rule (Qing dynasty).

The members of the Chinese Society of Righteous and Harmonious Fists were simply called boxers by the Westerners due to the martial arts and calisthenics they practiced. It began as an anti-foreign, anti-imperialist, peasant-based movement that attacked foreigners who were building railroads and violating Feng shui. Christians who they felt were responsible for foreign domination of China were also targeted. In June 1900, the Boxers invaded Beijing and killed 230 non-Chinese. The Qing commander in chief Ronglu expelled the Boxers from the city. The Qing ordered foreign diplomats and personnel to leave to Tianjin but they refused and stay put in the legation quarter of Beijing.

After the foreign attack at the Battle of Taku Forts (1900) and the foreign invasion in the Seymour Expedition the government of Empress Dowager Cixi ordered the Kansu Braves to surround the foreign  diplomats, civilians, soldiers and some Chinese Christians in the legation quarter. The "siege" lasted 55 days until a multinational coalition rushed 20,000 troops to their rescue in the Gaselee Expedition. The Chinese government was forced to indemnify the victims and make many additional concessions. Subsequent reforms implemented after the crisis of 1900 laid the foundation for the end of the Qing dynasty and the establishment of the modern Chinese Republic.

The Medal of Honor was created during the American Civil War and is the highest military decoration presented by the United States government to a member of its armed forces. The recipients must have distinguished themselves at the risk of their own life above and beyond the call of duty in action against an enemy of the United States. Due to the nature of this medal, it is commonly presented posthumously.

During the Boxer rebellion, 59 American servicemen received the Medal of Honor for their actions. Four of these were for Army personnel, twenty-two went to Navy sailors and the remaining thirty-three went to Marines.  Harry Fisher was the first Marine to receive the medal posthumously and the only posthumous recipient for this conflict.

Recipients

References
General

Specific

Further reading

Boxer Rebellion